Kongaye is a town in the Piéla Department of Gnagna Province in eastern Burkina Faso. The town has a population of 2586.

References

Populated places in the Est Region (Burkina Faso)
Gnagna Province